Sir John Holt (23 December 1642 – 5 March 1710) was an English lawyer who served as Lord Chief Justice of England from 17 April 1689 to his death. He is frequently credited with playing a major role in ending the prosecution of witches in English law.

Biography
Holt was born in Abingdon in Berkshire (now Oxfordshire), the son of Sir Thomas Holt, MP for that town, and his wife, Susan, the daughter of John Peacock of Chieveley, also in Berkshire. He was educated at John Roysse's Free School in Abingdon (now Abingdon School) from 1652 to 1658, Gray's Inn and Oriel College, Oxford.

He purchased Redgrave Manor in Suffolk, which had been the seat of the Bacon family in 1702, when debts forced the fifth baronet, Sir Robert Bacon, to sell the estate. A letter in the Bodleian Library reads: "The celebrated Dr Radcliffe, the physician ... took special pains to preserve the life of LCJ Holt's wife, whom he attended out of spite to her husband, who wished her dead." Sir John Holt's sister Susan was married to Francis Levett, Esq., tobacco merchant and brother of Sir Richard Levett, Lord Mayor of London.

Holt's father, Sir Thomas Holt, possessed a small patrimonial estate, but in order to supplement his income had adopted the profession of law, in which he was not very successful, although he was appointed serjeant-at-law in 1677, and afterwards for his political services to the Tories was rewarded with a knighthood. Sir Thomas Holt's father was Rowland Holt (d. 1634 according to the Berkshire herald's visitation of 1664–66), who was probably identical to the merchant Rowland Holt who was murdered by muggers in Clerkenwell Fields in January 1635 (1634 OS). The crime was particularly notorious in the ballads and broadsheets of the time.

After attending for some years the free school of the town of Abingdon, of which his father was recorder, young Holt in his sixteenth year entered Oriel College, Oxford. He is said to have spent a very dissipated youth, and even to have been in the habit of taking purses on the highway, but after entering Gray's Inn about 1660 he applied himself with exemplary diligence to the study of law. He was called to the bar in 1663. A supporter of civil and religious liberty, he distinguished himself in state trials by the manner in which he supported the pleas of the defendants.

In 1675 he married Ann Cropley, a daughter of Sir John Cropley, 1st Baronet, of Clerkenwell, Middlesex, but the marriage was without issue.

In 1685–1686 Holt was appointed recorder of London, and about the same time he was made king's serjeant and received the honour of knighthood. His giving a decision adverse to the pretensions of the king to exercise martial law in time of peace led to his dismissal from the office of recorder, but he was continued in the office of king's serjeant in order to prevent him from becoming counsel for accused persons. Having been one of the judges who acted as assessors to the peers in the Convention parliament, he took a leading part in arranging the constitutional change by which William III was called to the throne, and after his accession he was appointed Lord Chief Justice of the King's Bench. He is best known for the firmness with which he upheld his own prerogatives in opposition to the authority of the Houses of Parliament. While in sympathy with the Whig party, Holt maintained on the bench political impartiality, and held himself aloof from political intrigue.

On the retirement of Somers from the chancellorship in 1700 Holt was offered the Great Seal, but declined it. 

He died in London on 5 March 1710 and was buried in the chancel of Redgrave church. His magnificent monument was sculpted by Thomas Green.

Witchcraft trials
Historian John Callow argues in his 2022 book, The Last Witches of England, that sceptical jurists, especially Holt, had already largely stopped convictions for witchcraft under English law even before the Witchcraft Act 1735 finally concluded such prosecutions. Callow particularly credits Holt with great courage in doing so in the face of religious pressure, mob violence, and popular superstitious belief in witchcraft.

Cases

Crosse v Gardner (1689) Cart. 90, Lord Holt CJ held that 'An affirmation at the time of a sale is a warranty, provided it appears on evidence to be so intended.'
Robert Charnock
The tryal and condemnation of Capt. Thomas Vaughan for high treason (1696)
Turberville v Stampe (1697) 91 ER 1072 (nuisance and vicarious liability)
Medina v Staughton (1699) 1 Salk. 210, again on affirmations and warranties.
Rose case (1701-1703)
Coggs v Bernard (1703) 2 Ld Raym 909 (bailment)
Ashby v White (1703) 2 Ld Raym 938 (the right to vote)
Cole v Turner (1704) 87 ER 907 (definition of battery)
Walden v Holman (1704) 6 Mod 115, Ld Raym. 1015, 1 Salk. 6 (pleading in abatement; the legal name of a person)
Cockcroft v Smith (1705) 11 Mod 43, self-defence
Smith v Gould (1705–07) 2 Salk 666 (antagonism to slavery), but see 91 ER 566
Keeble v Hickeringill (1707) 11 East 574, Holt 19 (interference with property rights, "the duck pond case")

See also
 List of Old Abingdonians

References

Reports of Cases determined by Sir John Holt (1681–1710) appeared at London in 1738; John Paty and others, printed from original MSS., at London (1837). See Burnet's Own Times; Tatter, No. xiv.; a Life, published in 1764; Welsby, Lives of Eminent English Judges of the 17th and 18th Centuries (1846); Campbell's Lives of the Lord Chief Justices; and Foss, ''Lives of the Judges.

External links

 Will of Sir John Holt, The Life of the Right Honourable Sir John Holt, Knight, Lord Chief justice of the Court of King's-Bench, J. R. (A Gentleman of the Inner Temple), Printed for the Author and Sold by J. Worrall, 1764
 Sir John Holt (1642–1710): a biographical sketch, with especial reference to his witchcraft trials
  Sir John Holt, in: Welsby, W.N. (ed): Lives of eminent English judges of the seventeenth and eighteenth centuries (London, 1846)

1642 births
1710 deaths
Alumni of Oriel College, Oxford
18th-century English judges
Lord chief justices of England and Wales
English MPs 1689–1690
People educated at Abingdon School
People from Abingdon-on-Thames
People from Redgrave, Suffolk
Members of Gray's Inn
Members of the Parliament of England for Bere Alston
17th-century English judges